Blerim Nexhmi Rrustemi (born 4 February 1983) is an Albanian footballer from Kosovo, who plays as a defender. Rrustemi prefers play as a defensive midfielder, but played in defense for Alki Larnaca and the Albania National Team. He currently plays for German amateur side 1. FC Viersen.

Club career 
As a youngster, he has attended and played for Weston Collegiate Institute high-school in Toronto, Ontario, Canada. While in Toronto, he has played for CS Azzuri in 1999–2000 and the Toronto Supra in 2000–2001 which are both teams of the Canadian Professional Soccer League. He has also played for different Albanian teams in Toronto.

He moved to South America, playing for Portuguesa of Brasil in 2001–2002 and Defensor Sporting of Uruguay in 2002–2004.

Then he come back to Europe where he played between 2004 and 2008 in Germany at amateur teams Borussia Mönchengladbach II and Rot-Weiß Erfurt and couple of months in Denmark first division for AC Horsens. In 2008–2009 he played in Cyprus first division at Alki Larnaca. He signed for the Albanian team KS Vllaznia in October 2009.

Spending the latter years of hius career in the German lower leagues, he joined 1. FC Viersen from SC Union Nettetal in summer 2019.

International career 
Though originating from Kosovo like many players of Albanian ethnicity, he chose the Albania national football team. He received the Albanian citizenship on 23 March 2007. He made his debut for Albania in an August 2007 friendly match against Malta and earned a total of 3 caps, scoring no goals. His final international was a November 2007 European Championship qualification match against Belarus.

Privates 
He holds Albanian and Canadian passports.

References

External links
 German career stats - FuPa
 Albanian Players
 https://web.archive.org/web/20070816175812/http://tifozatkuqezi.com/njoftime.php

1983 births
Living people
Sportspeople from Vushtrri
Kosovo Albanians
Naturalized citizens of Canada
Sportspeople of Albanian descent
Association football defenders
Kosovan footballers
Albanian footballers
Albania international footballers
SC Toronto players
Associação Portuguesa de Desportos players
Defensor Sporting players
Borussia Mönchengladbach II players
AC Horsens players
FC Rot-Weiß Erfurt players
Alki Larnaca FC players
KF Vllaznia Shkodër players
FC Wegberg-Beeck players
Goslarer SC 08 players
SSVg Velbert players
Canadian Soccer League (1998–present) players
Danish Superliga players
Uruguayan Primera División players
Cypriot First Division players
Kategoria Superiore players
Albanian expatriate footballers
Expatriate soccer players in Canada
Expatriate footballers in Brazil
Expatriate footballers in Uruguay
Expatriate footballers in Germany
Expatriate men's footballers in Denmark
Expatriate footballers in Cyprus
Albanian expatriate sportspeople in Canada
Albanian expatriate sportspeople in Germany
Albanian expatriate sportspeople in Denmark
Albanian expatriate sportspeople in Cyprus
Kosovan expatriate sportspeople in Germany
Kosovan expatriate sportspeople in Denmark
Kosovan expatriate sportspeople in Cyprus